LaCrosse is a town in Alachua County, Florida,  north of Gainesville. As of the 2010 census, the town population was 360, up from 143 in 2000. The area around LaCrosse is devoted to agriculture, especially potatoes; the area is known as the "Potato District." Other products of the area include tobacco, vegetables, and cattle.

History

LaCrosse was an agricultural village by 1860, in an area mostly given over to cotton farming at the time. A post office was opened in LaCrosse in 1881, LaCrosse Missionary Baptist Church was established in 1884 and LaCrosse was incorporated as a town on December 17, 1897.

Geography

LaCrosse is located at  (29.8442, –82.4040).

Demographics

As of the census of 2000, there were 143 people, 62 households, and 37 families residing in the town. The racial makeup of the town was 76.92% White, 21.68% African American, and 1.40% from two or more races. Hispanic or Latino of any race were 6.99% of the population.

There were 62 households, out of which 19.4% had children under the age of 18 living with them, 45.2% were married couples living together, 8.1% had a female householder with no husband present, and 40.3% were non-families. 32.3% of all households were made up of individuals, and 8.1% had someone living alone who was 65 years of age or older. The average household size was 2.31 and the average family size was 2.89.

In the town, the population was spread out, with 17.5% under the age of 18, 10.5% from 18 to 24, 25.9% from 25 to 44, 31.5% from 45 to 64, and 14.7% who were 65 years of age or older. The median age was 42 years. For every 100 females, there were 107.2 males. For every 100 females age 18 and over, there were 110.7 males.

The median income for a household in the town was $22,750, and the median income for a family was $29,583. Males had a median income of $24,286 versus $31,250 for females. The per capita income for the town was $13,633. There were 22.9% of families and 28.5% of the population living below the poverty line, including 28.6% of under eighteens and 65.0% of those over 64.

Education

LaCrosse is served by the School Board of Alachua County. The Alachua County Library District serves LaCrosse with a weekly bookmobile stop.

Notable people 

 Hewritt Dixon (1940–1992), NFL player

References

External links

Town of LaCrosse official website

Towns in Alachua County, Florida
Gainesville metropolitan area, Florida
Populated places established in 1860
Towns in Florida